Gibbon is an unincorporated community in Umatilla County, Oregon, United States.

Gibbon is a station on the Union Pacific railroad that was named for Major General John Gibbon, who was in command of the Department of the Columbia based in Vancouver, Washington, in 1885–86. At the time the railroad was being constructed,  a station at or near Gibbon was named Mikecha, made up from the names of three civil engineers named Mink, Kennedy, and Chalk. The name of the post office, however, remained Gibbon. Gibbon post office ran from 1892 through 1966. At some point, the name of the railroad station was changed back to Gibbon. Today, Gibbon has an Adams mailing address.

As of 1940, Gibbon had a school that served both Native American and other children.

Climate
This region experiences warm and dry summers, with no average monthly temperatures above .  According to the Köppen climate classification, Gibbon has a warm-summer Mediterranean climate, Csb on climate maps.

Education
The community is served by the Athena Weston School District.

References

External links
Historic images of Gibbon from the Picturing the Cayuse, Walla Walla, and Umatilla Tribes collection of the University of Oregon digital archives
Images of the Union Pacific railroad at Gibbon from Flickr

Unincorporated communities in Umatilla County, Oregon
1892 establishments in Oregon
Populated places established in 1892
Unincorporated communities in Oregon